The 1961 Hong Kong Urban Council election was supposed to be held in March 1961 for the four of the eight elected seats of the Urban Council of Hong Kong.

In 1960 the two major political groups in the Council, the Civic Association and Reform Club formed a four-year coalition for a further constitutional reform in Hong Kong. The Coalition met with the Colonial Office in London however their demands were rejected.

The Civic-Reform Coalition joined the election and no contest was seen that year. The four candidates, Civic's Hilton Cheong-Leen, Li Yiu-bor and Woo Pak-foo of the Civic Association and Reform's Brook Bernacchi were all re-elected.

Elected members

References
 Lau, Y.W. (2002). A history of the municipal councils of Hong Kong : 1883-1999 : from the Sanitary Board to the Urban Council and the Regional Council. Leisure and Cultural Service Dept. 
 Pepper, Suzanne (2008). Keeping Democracy at Bay:Hong Kong and the Challenge of Chinese Political Reform. Rowman & Littlefield.

Hong Kong
1961 in Hong Kong
Urban
Uncontested elections
March 1961 events in Asia
1961 elections in the British Empire